Meridian Peak is a mountain summit in the Gore Range of the Rocky Mountains of North America.

Hiking
Meridian Peak can be found at the southern end of Elliot Ridge Trail.  It can be reached by ascending several hiking trails into the Gore Range.  Surprise Lake Trail goes south for 2.6 miles to Surprise Lake, then the Gore Range Trail continues west for 1.9 miles to a junction with the Upper Cataract Lake and Mirror Lake Trail.  Mirror Lake is 6.5 miles beyond the junction, at an elevation of 10,560 feet.  The Elliot Ridge Trail is 3.2 miles from Mirror Lake.  The summit of Meridian Peak is another 1.2 south from the junction with the Elliot Ridge Trail.

See also

List of Colorado mountain ranges
List of Colorado mountain summits
List of Colorado fourteeners
List of Colorado 4000 meter prominent summits
List of the most prominent summits of Colorado
List of Colorado county high points

References
Notes

Sources

Elliot Ridge one of a kind
Two of three snowmobilers found

External links

Mountains of Colorado
Mountains of Eagle County, Colorado
Mountains of Summit County, Colorado
Arapaho National Forest
White River National Forest
North American 3000 m summits
Eagles Nest Wilderness